Hugh Reynolds Pomeroy (May 29, 1899 - July 1, 1961) served in the California State Assembly for the 62nd district from 1923 to 1925 and during World War I he served in the United States Army.

References

External links

Family Search Hugh Pomeroy Family tree

United States Army personnel of World War I
20th-century American politicians
Republican Party members of the California State Assembly
1899 births
1961 deaths